Lectionary 254, designated by siglum ℓ 254 (in the Gregory-Aland numbering) is a Greek manuscript of the New Testament, on parchment. Palaeographically it has been assigned to the 11th century. The manuscript has survived on only one leaf.

Description 

The original codex contained lessons from the Gospels lectionary (Evangelistarium).
The manuscript has survived on only one leaf. It contains text from the Gospel of Matthew 24:34-25:13.

The text is written in Greek large minuscule letters, on 1 parchment leaf, in one column per page, 14 lines per page. It contains musical notes. The nomina sacra are written in an abbreviated way.

It has been assigned by the Institute for New Testament Textual Research to the 11th century.

History 

The manuscript used to be held at the Mount Athos. The name of the scribe was Michael.

The manuscript was examined and described by Peter P. Dubrovsky and Eduard de Muralt.

The manuscript was added to the list of New Testament manuscripts by Gregory (number 254).

The manuscript is not cited in the critical editions of the Greek New Testament (UBS3).

The codex is housed at the Russian National Library (Gr. 80) in Saint Petersburg, Russia.

See also 

 List of New Testament lectionaries
 Biblical manuscript
 Textual criticism
 Lectionary 253

Notes and references

Bibliography 

 Eduard de Muralt, Catalogue des manuscrits grecs de la Bibliothèque Impériale publique (Petersburg 1864), p. 48 (as LXXX)

Greek New Testament lectionaries
11th-century biblical manuscripts
National Library of Russia collection